Yateley is a town and civil parish in the English county of Hampshire. It lies in the north-eastern corner of Hart District Council area. It includes the settlements of Frogmore and Darby Green to the east. It had a population of 21,011 at the 2001 census. The four wards that comprise Yateley and their 2001 populations are Yateley East (5,168), Yateley North (5,078), Yateley West (5,149), and Frogmore & Darby Green (5,616). The 2009 projection was 20,214, according to the Hart District Council website. Yateley Town Council is one of the few local councils to have been recognised under the national 'Quality Council' award scheme.

In 2011 Hart district was named the UK's most desirable place to live, and Yateley was mentioned on a BBC News article as one of the towns within the district.

History
The name Yateley derives from the Middle English 'Yate' meaning 'Gate' (into Windsor Forest) and 'Lea' which was a 'forest clearing'. Although in historic records, variations of the spelling include Hyatele, Yateleghe, Yatche, Yatelighe, Yeatley, Yeateley and Yatelegh.

Amenities

The parish church is St Peter's. It was badly damaged in a fire in 1979 and subsequently restored. Its outstanding feature is an early 16th century wooden bell tower housing a ring of eight bells. The tower survived the fire but the bells were cracked and had to be recast. The church is a Grade II listed building. The White Lion pub, is also Grade II listed.

Sports
Yateley Football Club was established in 1927 for men's football. In 1967 Yateley Juniors FC was formed. In 2008 both these clubs, and two others, merged to form a single club called Yateley United FC. Yateley United currently compete in the Thames Valley Premier League and play their games at the newly developed Sean Devereux Park.

Yateley Cricket Club (YCC) was established in 1881, originally playing at the Cricketers Pub on Cricket Hill, and then on “The Green” on the Reading Road.  In 1999 YCC moved to a new purpose built ground and clubhouse at Sean Devereux Park.

Education

Following the closure and amalgamation of St Peter's Church of England Junior School and Yateley Infant School, a new primary school opened in September 2010. Named Cranford Park CE Primary School.

Yateley School is the largest secondary school in north-east Hampshire. It caters for children aged 11 to 16 and has an attached sixth-form college.

Frogmore Community College is another secondary school in Yateley.

Yateley Manor School is an independent school catering for around 500 pupils aged 3 to 13.

Notable people

Singer Alexa Goddard attended Yateley School.
Flora Thompson, author of the trilogy of novels 'Lark Rise to Candleford' is recorded in the 1901 Census as living and working in the Yateley Post Office. These books have since been adapted for television by the BBC.
Sonny Black a leading UK acoustic guitarist also lives in Yateley.
Contemporary artist James Robert Ford grew up in Yateley and attended Yateley School. A number of his projects, including House Gymnastics, General Carbuncle, and 33 Things to do before you're 10, have taken place in Yateley.
Chris Benham, a Hampshire cricketer, grew up in Yateley and attended Yateley School.
Author Danny King grew up in Yateley and attended Yateley School.
Sean Devereux, a charity worker in Somalia, came from Yateley. He was assassinated and Sean Devereux Park is named after him.
David Copeland, known as the "London Nailbomber" after a 13-day bombing campaign in April 1999 aimed at London's black, Asian, and gay communities, grew up in Yateley, though residing in nearby Cove in Farnborough at the time of the attack.
Robert Morgan, stop-motion animation filmmaker, grew up here.
Jed Wallace, a professional footballer playing for West Bromwich Albion attended Frogmore Community College.
Aaron Kuhl, a semi-professional former Reading footballer, currently playing for Slough Town, lives in Yateley.

References

External links

 h2g2 Yateley Edited Guide Entry
 Yateley Town Council

Towns in Hampshire